Waverly Hill is a historic mansion located at Staunton, Virginia. It was designed by architect William Lawrence Bottomley (1883–1951) and built in 1929.  It consists of a 2 1/2–story, five-bay, center section flanked by one-story wings connected by low, one-story hyphens in the Georgian Revival style.  The house is constructed of brick, and the central section and wings are topped by slate-covered hipped roofs.

It was added to the National Register of Historic Places in 1982.

References

Houses on the National Register of Historic Places in Virginia
Georgian Revival architecture in Virginia
Houses completed in 1929
Houses in Staunton, Virginia
National Register of Historic Places in Staunton, Virginia